West Melton is a former mining village in the parish of Brampton Bierlow in South Yorkshire, England. It lies between Wath upon Dearne and Brampton Bierlow, roughly 5 miles north of Rotherham and 5 miles south-east of Barnsley. The village falls within the Wath parish of the Rotherham Metropolitan Borough Council.
It contains several churches, among them are West Melton United Reformed Church and Princess Street Methodist Church.

Notable people
Bernard Radford (1908–1986), footballer

See also
Listed buildings in Rotherham (Hoober Ward)

References

External links

Villages in South Yorkshire
Geography of the Metropolitan Borough of Rotherham